Lycée Jean-Mermoz is a senior high school/sixth-form college in Saint-Louis, Haut-Rhin, France, in the Basel-Mulhouse-Freiburg area.

The school opened on 29 June 1958 and received its current building on 3 May 2008.

References

External links
 Lycée Jean-Mermoz 

Lycées in Haut-Rhin
1958 establishments in France
Educational institutions established in 1958